Paradise Found may refer to:

 Paradise Found (film), 2003 biographical film
 Paradise Found (musical), 2010 London musical
 Paradise Found (album), a 1998 album by Tuck & Patti
 "Paradise Found", song from the 2009 Pixar film Up
 "Paradise Found", 1979 song by Amii Stewart on the album Paradise Bird
 "Paradise Found", 2017 song by Shawn Austin
 "Paradise Found/Luck Before You Leap", episode of Iggy Arbuckle

See also
 Paradise Regained, a 1671 poem by John Milton